Davide Lo Surdo (born July 24, 1999) is an Italian guitarist. Rolling Stone described him as “the fastest guitarist in history” due to his ability to play 129 notes per second.

Early life 

Lo Surdo was born in 1999 in Rome. He started playing guitar at the age of nine.

Career 

Lo Surdo was awarded at the Sanremo Music Awards in Italy as the fastest guitarist of all time and in 2020, he released Destiny, which was included in the Sanremo Music Awards compilation 2020.

During his tour of India in January 2020, Lo Surdo played in cities such as Guwahati, Kharagpur, and Calcutta, and performed at the 10th edition of Rolling Stone Music & Run at Anhembi Sambadrome in São Paulo, Brazil the following year.

Lo Surdo also toured in Mexico, United States, Germany, United Kingdom and he played with Steve Vai, Jeff Loomis, Mark Boals and Mike Stern. 

In May 2021, he performed for Bengali Television DBC News and the following year, he played in Bolivia on television networks Red Uno de Bolivia and Red ATB in the programs “El Mañanero” and “La Mañana de Todos”. 

In 2022, Lo Surdo released Full Emersion, in which he reflected on the radical changes in his life.

Style  

Inspired by Michael Angelo Batio, his style is shred.

To reach 129 notes per second, Lo Surdo uses the sweep picking technique, playing a sequence of five arpeggios on the first three strings of the guitar.

Discography

Destiny (Sanremo Music Awards Compilation) (2020)
Resilience (2022)
Full Emersion (2022)

References

External links 
 

1999 births
Living people
Italian male guitarists
Italian rock guitarists
Lead guitarists